This is a list of notable software forks.

Undated
The many varieties of proprietary Unix in the 1980s and 1990s — almost all derived from AT&T Unix under licence and all called "Unix", but increasingly mutually incompatible. See UNIX wars.
Most Linux distributions are descended from other distributions, most being traceable back to Debian, Red Hat or Softlanding Linux System (see image right). Since most of the content of a distribution is free and open source software, ideas and software interchange freely as is useful to the individual distribution. Merges (e.g., United Linux or Mandriva) are rare.
Pretty Good Privacy, forked outside of the United States to free it from restrictive US laws on the exportation of cryptographic software.
The game NetHack has spawned a number of variants using the original code, notably Slash'EM (1997), and was itself a fork (1987) of Hack.
Openswan and strongSwan, from the discontinued FreeS/WAN.

1981 

Symbolics Lisp Machine operating system,  later called Symbolics Genera. Forked from the MIT Lisp Machine operating system, which was licensed by MIT to Symbolics in 1980. This fork later motivated Richard Stallman to start the GNU Project.

1985 

POSTGRES (later PostgreSQL), after Ingres branched off as a proprietary project.

1990 

Microsoft SQL Server, from Sybase SQL Server, via a technology-sharing agreement concerning the Tabular Data Stream protocol.
SWLPC, from LPMud.

1991 

 Xemacs, from GNU Emacs, originally for Lucid Corporation internal needs.

1993 

FreeBSD, started as a patchkit to 386BSD.
NetBSD, started as a patchkit to 386BSD.

1995 

Apache HTTP Server, from the moribund NCSA HTTPd.
OpenBSD, a fork of NetBSD 1.0 by Theo de Raadt due to internal developer personality clashes.

1997 

EGCS was a fork of GCC, later named as the official version.

1998 
Grace, from Xmgr, after that project ceased development.

1999 

FilmGIMP, later called CinePaint, from GIMP, to handle 48-bit colour.
OSSH from SSH, when that project was proprietised.
OpenSSH, from OSSH.
Sodipodi, from Gill.
Steel Bank Common Lisp, from CMU Common Lisp.

2000 

 TrueCrypt, from E4M when the latter was discontinued.
 Tux Racer went proprietary in 2000, leading to several forks including OpenRacer, PlanetPenguin Racer and Extreme Tux Racer.
 OpenOffice.org, from StarOffice after Sun Microsystems made the source code publicly available. OpenOffice.org was eventually forked into LibreOffice.

2001 

ELinks, began as an experimental fork of Links.
Fluxbox, from Blackbox.
GNU Radio, from pSpectra.
Xvid, was a fork of OpenDivX.
WebKit, project was started within Apple by Don Melton on 25 June 2001 as a fork of KHTML.

2002 

 GForge, from SourceForge. 
 GraphicsMagick, from ImageMagick due to concerns over the openness of development.
 The Matroska container format, from the Multimedia Container Format, due to differences in direction.
 MirOS BSD, from OpenBSD.
 Syllable Desktop, from the stagnant AtheOS.

2003 

aMule, from xMule, which itself forked from lMule shortly before, over developer disagreements.
b2evolution, from b2/CafeLog.
DragonFly BSD, from FreeBSD 4.8 by long-time FreeBSD developer Matt Dillon, due to disagreement over FreeBSD 5's technical direction.
Epiphany, from Galeon, after developer disagreements about Galeon's growing complexity.
Inkscape (vector-graphics program), from Sodipodi.
NeoOffice, a fork of OpenOffice.org, with an incompatible license (GPL rather than LGPL), due to disagreements about licensing and about the best method to port OpenOffice.org to Mac OS X.
The Safari renderer that became WebKit, from KHTML.
sK1, from Skencil when the latter moved from Tk to GTK+.
WordPress, from b2/CafeLog.
Zen Cart, from osCommerce.

2004 

Baz, the previous version of Bazaar, from GNU arch.
FrostWire, from LimeWire after LimeWire's developers considered adding RIAA-sponsored blocking code.
MediaPortal, from XBMC.
WineX (later Cedega), was a proprietary fork of Wine.
XOrg, from XFree86, in order to adopt a more open development model and due to concerns over the latter's change to a license many distributors found unacceptable.

2005 

Audacious, from Beep Media Player to continue work on the old version of that project. 
Joomla, from Mambo due to concerns over project structure.
Claws Mail, from Sylpheed, due to perceived slowness in accepting enhancements.

2006 

Adempiere, a community maintained fork of Compiere 2.5.3b, due to disagreement with commercial and technical direction of Compiere Inc.
Cdrkit, from Cdrtools due to perceived licensing issues.
LedgerSMB, from SQL-Ledger, due to disagreements over handling of security issues.
MindTouch, a fork of MediaWiki.
Mulgara, from Kowari after trademark threats from Northrop Grumman.
MPC-HC, a fork of Media Player Classic.

2007 
Batavi, from osCommerce, due to that project's slow release schedule.
Go-oo, from OpenOffice.org, due to that project's contributor licensing agreement.

2008 
 Boxee, a proprietary fork of XBMC.
 Dreamwidth, from LiveJournal by ex-LiveJournal developers.
 Drizzle, was intended as a slimmed-down and faster fork of MySQL.
 MiaCMS, from Mambo.
 Plex, a proprietary fork of XBMC.

2009 

dbndns, from djbdns after the latter was released into the public domain and abandoned.
Freeplane, from FreeMind.
FusionForge, from GForge when GForge shifted focus to its proprietary version.
Icinga, from Nagios, due to perceived slow development and problems dealing with Nagios LLC.
kompoZer, from Nvu after that project went dormant.
MariaDB, from MySQL, over concern as to Sun Microsystems' plans for the latter.
Pale Moon, from Firefox.
Qt Extended Improved, from Qtopia after the latter was discontinued by Qt Software.
Voddler, is a proprietary fork of XBMC and FFmpeg.

2010 
Peppermint Linux OS, from Lubuntu, due to a perceived need for a cloud-centric derivative of the Ubuntu OS.
Chamilo, from Dokeos, due to community management concerns with that project.
LibreOffice, from OpenOffice.org (and merging Go-oo), due to Oracle Corporation's perceived neglect of the software.  
OpenIndiana, from OpenSolaris after Oracle Corporation discontinued the latter.
 Illumos, from the OpenSolaris kernel OS/Net, after Oracle closed down public access to the source code.
webtrees, from PhpGedView, due to SourceForge's policy on exporting encryption.
Xonotic, from Nexuiz, after that project was taken proprietary.
 Mageia, from Mandriva Linux, due to financial uncertainty and the layoff by Edge-IT, a Mandriva subsidiary employing many of the corporate staff working on the Mandriva distribution
OpenAM, from OpenSSO after Oracle Corporation discontinued the latter.
Calligra, from KOffice after developer disagreements.

2011 
Fire OS, a fork of Android for the Kindle Fire
Jenkins, from Hudson (2011), due to Oracle Corporation's perceived neglect of the project's infrastructure and disagreements over use of the name on non-Oracle-maintained infrastructure.
Univa Grid Engine, from Oracle Grid Engine, after Oracle Corporation stopped releasing project source.
Mer, started as a fork of MeeGo.
libav, a fork of ffmpeg.
WooCommerce, a fork of Jigoshop.

2012 

 MPC-BE, a fork of Media Player Classic

2013 
Blink, a fork of WebKit.
SuiteCRM, from the last open source version of SugarCRM.

2014 
LibreSSL, from OpenSSL.
Nokia X software platform, a fork of the Android Open Source Project developed by Nokia exclusively for its X family of Android smartphones.
io.js from node.js. In 2015 it was blessed as the official version of node.js.

2015 
EdgeHTML, from Trident
Open Live Writer, from Windows Live Writer 2012

2016 
Collabora Online, from LibreOffice, Collabora Online is a web-based enterprise ready edition of LibreOffice
Goanna, from Gecko
Nextcloud, from ownCloud

2017 
Basilisk, from Firefox.
Bitcoin Cash, from Bitcoin Core, supported by the forked implementations Bitcoin ABC, Bitcoin Unlimited and Bitcoin XT.
Unified XUL Platform, from XUL.

2019 
Trino_(SQL_query_engine), from Presto_(SQL_query_engine).

2021 
White Star, from Pale Moon.

References